Anne Arundel County Free School is a historic school building at Davidsonville, Anne Arundel County, Maryland.  The first Free School of Anne Arundel County was established by an Act of the General Assembly of colonial Maryland in 1723. It was built somewhere between its contractual date of 1724 and 1746 when it was under full operation with John Wilmot as schoolmaster. The existing abandoned building is 49' x 18', and consists of six rooms on two floors. It was built "as near the center of the county as may be, and as may be the most convenient for the boarding of children."  The county then included what is now Howard County.  It remained in operation until 1912 when the movement toward consolidation forced the closure of many early school buildings. It is the only surviving schoolhouse erected in Maryland in response to the Maryland Free School Act of 1723.

It may have served a prominent role in history as Johns Hopkins likely attended the school from 1806 to 1809. Later, when Hopkins's abolitionist parents freed their slaves, he was forced to quit school and work in their tobacco fields.  His great value for education later led to his founding of The Johns Hopkins University.

It was listed on the National Register of Historic Places in 1983.

The school is now a museum owned by the local board of education.  It is open for school groups and seasonally on Sunday afternoons. It is taken care of by the Anne Arundel Retired Educators Association.

Recently, there have been improvements made to the building and surrounding grounds. One of these has been the construction of a gravel walkway leading to the building from the road. The walkway was built as part of an Eagle Scout project by a local Boy Scout.

Gallery

References

External links

, including photo from 1990, at Maryland Historical Trust

School buildings on the National Register of Historic Places in Maryland
Museums in Anne Arundel County, Maryland
School buildings completed in 1724
Education museums in the United States
History museums in Maryland
Historic American Buildings Survey in Maryland
National Register of Historic Places in Anne Arundel County, Maryland
1724 establishments in the Thirteen Colonies